The Almirante Padilla-class frigates is a series of frigates operated by the Colombian Navy. The designation of this class is Type FS 1500 and there are four ships in service. The ships were built by Howaldtswerke-Deutsche Werft (HDW) at Kiel, West Germany in the 1980s, with the first vessel commissioning in 1983 and the last in 1984. The frigates have undergone significant modification over their careers with the 2012 Orion Program Upgrade significantly modernising the vessels. Two similar ships operate as the s in the Royal Malaysian Navy.

Design and description
Colombia ordered four frigates of the West German Type FS 1500 design in 1980 with the first ship intended to be delivered in 1982. The Colombian Navy intended to upgrade these frigates as funding became available as they became the most powerful ships in their arsenal with the retirement of the older destroyers. Two vessels of a modified design serve with the Royal Malaysian Navy. They initially had a complement of 92 which rose to 94 by 2009. The ships are equipped with fin stabilizers.

Propulsion
The Almirante Padilla class is powered by a CODAD propulsion system. The frigates were powered by four MTU 20V 1163 TB92 diesel engines driving two shafts and developing maximum  and  sustained turning two controllable pitch propellers. These were the first ships to mount these engines. The ships carried  of fuel and were capable of generating 2,120 kW of power.

Electronics
Almirante Padilla-class frigates were initially equipped with one Thomson-CSF Sea Tiger air search radar, one Castor IIB fire control radar. The vessels had a Krupp Atlas AS04-2 hull-mounted sonar, a Racal Scimitar electronic warfare jammer and two Dagaie chaff launchers. The ships have been improved through the years later receiving Thomson-CSF TAVITAC combat action data systems and Argo AC672 electronic support measures.

Armament

For anti-air defence, the frigates were initially armed with twin-mounted Breda  guns and four Emerlac  guns in two twin mounts. By 2009 the 30 mm guns had been removed. A space was left in front of the bridge to allow for the later installation of surface-to-air missiles (SAMs). The French Mistral SAM system was chosen composed of two twin Matra Simbad launchers.

Aircraft

The Almirante Padilla class does have a hangar facility, and thus can embark a helicopter. The landing platform aft is suitable for a Messerschmitt-Bölkow-Blohm MBB Bo 105 CBS-5 or the Eurocopter AS-555-SN Fennec helicopters for over-the-horizon targeting.

Orion Program Upgrade
The Orion Program Upgrade was a mid-life refit performed by the Thales Group. In January 2012, Thales Group delivered the first upgraded Almirante Padilla-class frigates to the Colombian Navy. The equipment upgrades included a series of new sensors including the Smart-s Mk2 radar, TACTICOS combat system, Sting-EO Mk2 naval fire control tracking system, MIRADOR electro-optical multi-sensor surveillance, tracking and fire control system. For defence, the vessels were upgraded with the Vigile Radar Electronic Support Measures (RESM) system and TERMA SKSW DL-12T decoy system. They were given new MTU M-93 engines and new communication systems. In addition, OTO Melara DART ammunition and 16 SSM-700K Hae Sung I (Sea Star) anti-ship missiles were ordered. In September 2014, Colombia fired the DART guided ammunition from the Oto Melara 76 mm Strales. The testing was performed aboard Caldas.

Ships in class

Service history
The Almirante Padilla-class frigates are used primarily to patrol Colombia's exclusive economic zone and perform anti-narcotic patrols in Colombian waters. The frigates have also taken part in naval exercises such as UNITAS and PANAMAX. The frigates can also be used to resupply outlying military posts on Colombian islands.

Notes

Citations

References

External links

Frigate classes
Frigates of the Colombian Navy